Donald Arthur Hillman,  (June 25, 1925 – July 4, 2006) was a Canadian paediatrician and professor of pediatrics best known for working in Third World countries in international child health and development. He held positions at McMaster University, Universiti Sains Malaysia, Boston University, and the University of Ottawa.

Biography
Born in Montreal, Quebec, he received a Bachelor of Science from McGill University in 1942. He received his Doctor of Medicine from the McGill University Medical School in 1949. In 1961, he received a Ph.D. in Investigative Medicine from McGill University.

From 1976 to 1989, he was a professor in Memorial University of Newfoundland’s Faculty of Medicine as well as physician-in-chief at the Janeway Child Health Centre in St. John's, Newfoundland and Labrador.

He died in 2006 in Ottawa.

Honours
In 1989, he and his wife Elizabeth Hillman were given the Canadian Paediatric Society Ross Award for Outstanding Achievements in Pediatrics. In 1992, they were award the Christopherson International Award by the American Academy of Pediatrics. In 1994, he and his wife Elizabeth Hillman were made Officers of the Order of Canada for having "consistently used their talents and energy to improve the welfare of children throughout the world".  In 2004, he was awarded an honorary Doctor of Laws from Memorial University of Newfoundland.

References
 
 

1925 births
2006 deaths
Anglophone Quebec people
Canadian Anglicans
Canadian medical researchers
Officers of the Order of Canada
Physicians from Montreal
Academic staff of McMaster University
McGill University Faculty of Medicine alumni
Academic staff of the Memorial University of Newfoundland
Canadian pediatricians
Academic staff of the University of Ottawa